RDS Info is a  Canadian French language discretionary digital cable 24-hour sports information specialty channel. It is owned by CTV Specialty Television Inc., a division of Bell Media (80%) and ESPN (20%).

The channel was launched on October 21, 2004, under the name Réseau Info-Sports (or RIS)

On January 23, 2012, RIS launched a high definition feed and rebranded as "RDS Info".

Programming
RDS Info operates on a rotating 30 minute news wheel of sports scores, news and highlights, along with a ticker containing current sports news and scores which remains on-screen during most programming, a format similar to ESPNews.

Its core news programming is called Sports 30. The program airs live every day at 5:00 a.m., 12:00 p.m., 4:00 p.m., 6:00 p.m. and 10:00 p.m. to 2:30 a.m. The 5:00am edition is 15 minutes long and the 6:00pm edition lasts an hour on weekdays and 30 minutes on weekends. Outside these times, to incorporate into the 30-minute news wheel, Sports 30 is usually "looped".

Before the launch of RDS2, RDS Info also served as a secondary feed for sister network RDS, airing alternate programming that could not be aired on the main network, such as National Hockey League regular season and playoff games, Monday Night Football, and other events. It continues to act as a tertiary outlet for RDS programming in the event of multiple schedule conflicts.

References

External links
  

Sports television networks in Canada
Bell Media networks
The Sports Network
Television channels and stations established in 2005
French-language television networks in Canada
Digital cable television networks in Canada